Crestview is a neighborhood in the Westside of the city of Los Angeles, California.

Geography
Crestview is bounded by Pickford Street on the north, Sawyer Street on the south, Robertson Boulevard on the west, and La Cienega Boulevard on the east.

Adjacent Neighborhoods
Beverlywood is located to the west, Castle Heights is located on the southwest, La Cienega Heights is located to the south, Pico-Robertson is located to the north and Faircrest Heights is located to the east.

References

Neighborhoods in Los Angeles
Westside (Los Angeles County)
West Los Angeles